The Benjamin Smith House is a historic building in Downtown Columbus, Ohio. It was listed on the National Register of Historic Places in 1973. The house was built c. 1860 for Benjamin E. Smith, a wealthy financier. Smith lived in the house until 1883, when he moved to New York City. Rented by Ohio as a governor's mansion, it housed Ohio governors George Hoadly and Joseph Foraker. In 1886, the Columbus Club, a private club in the city, purchased the house and grounds, and are still housed there today.

The house was designed by Nathan B. Kelley, also one of the principal architects of the Ohio Statehouse.

See also
 National Register of Historic Places listings in Columbus, Ohio

References

External links
 

Buildings in downtown Columbus, Ohio
Ohio
Houses completed in the 19th century
Houses in Columbus, Ohio
Houses on the National Register of Historic Places in Ohio
Italianate architecture in Ohio
National Register of Historic Places in Columbus, Ohio
Second Empire architecture in Ohio
Broad Street (Columbus, Ohio)